Shoukouwa is a two Michelin-starred Japanese sushi restaurant in Singapore. The restaurant  serves traditional edomae-style sushi courses with ingredients imported from Japan four times per week.

Shoukouwa was opened by Belgium-born chef Emmanuel Stroobant in 2016. Kazumine Nishida currently serves as the restaurant's head chef. It is located in One Fullerton, adjacent to Stroobant's French restaurant, Saint Pierre.

When the restaurant launched in 2016, the Michelin Guide of Singapore noted that only four months after opening, “Shoukouwa sushi restaurant became the only Japanese restaurant in Singapore to be awarded 2 Michelin stars”.

References 

Restaurants established in 2016
Michelin Guide starred restaurants in Singapore
2016 establishments in Singapore
Sushi restaurants